The Society for Women's Health Research (SWHR) is a national non-profit organization based in Washington D.C. SWHR is the thought leader in research on biological differences in disease and is dedicated to transforming women's health through science, advocacy, and education.

Founded in 1990 by Florence Haseltine, PhD, MD, SWHR aims to bring national attention to the need for the appropriate inclusion of women and minorities in major medical research studies and the need for more information about diseases and conditions affecting women exclusively, predominantly, or differently than men. It also promotes the analysis of research data for sex and ethnic differences; and informs women, healthcare providers, and policy makers about contemporary women's health issues through media outreach, briefings, conferences, and special events.

As a result of SWHR's work, women and minorities are now included in medical research and clinical trials; scientists are researching the ways in which health conditions and diseases affect men and women differently and why. Through SWHR's use of evidence-based research and multi-pronged policy and public education efforts, as well as the involvement of health care providers and policy makers dedicated to improving women's health, sex differences is now a national priority.

History
SWHR was founded by Florence Haseltine as the Society for the Advancement of Women's Health Research in 1990. When Haseltine began working at the National Institutes of Health (NIH), she was told that her "role was to champion the field of obstetrics and gynecology," which at the time were under-represented in research. In 1985, NIH lacked sufficient in-house expertise and funding for academic scientists. When her friend, Congresswoman Rosa DeLauro, developed ovarian cancer, Haseltine seized the opportunity to promote the need for more research into conditions affecting women.

In the spring of 1989, Dr. Haseltine gathered friends and colleagues from medical and scientific organizations across the country to address this critical issue. They congregated at the American College of Obstetricians and Gynecologists (ACOG) and agreed on the need not only for more gynecological research at NIH but also for research regarding women's health in general. This meeting gave rise to SWHR.

In 1990, due to biases in biomedical research, the health of American women was at risk. SWHR's first Board of Directors made it their priority to confront this injustice. They worked with the Congressional Caucus for Women's Issues, its Executive Director - Leslie Primer, and Congressman Henry Waxman (D-CA) to persuade the General Accounting Office (GAO; now the Government Accountability Office) to address the issue. They recommended that GAO evaluate NIH's policies and practices regarding the inclusion of women and minorities in clinical trials.

SWHR ensured that its dedicated leadership included a diverse group of health care providers and others concerned with research and health care equity, to provide a range of perspectives. Included in the initial gathering at ACOG and later on the first SWHR Board were physicians and researchers specializing in cardiology, mental health, and obstetrics-gynecology, as well as nurses, lawyers, and public policy advocates involved and interested in women's health. In 1993, SWHR opened its official headquarters in Washington, D.C. and hired its first professional staff. Phyllis Greenberger, MSW, was selected as the first Executive Director.

The audit was successfully released at an NIH re-authorization hearing in June 1990. It concluded that the NIH policy of 1986, which encouraged the inclusion of women in clinical trials, had been poorly communicated and misunderstood within NIH and the research community at large. Additionally, it was applied inconsistently across Institutes and was only applied to extramural research (research conducted outside NIH). The GAO report concluded that there was "…no readily accessible source of data on the demographics of NIH study populations." This made it impossible to determine if NIH was enforcing its own recommendations.

Activities
SWHR maintains three programmatic areas to accomplish its mission:
Scientific Programs
Advocacy
Education

Goals
In 2015, the Society for Women's Health Research is looking ahead to challenges facing the country with healthcare and health reforms. SWHR will continue to identify the gaps in health care and research that still exist, target those differences and close the gaps. SWHR strives to ensure that women's health remains a high priority on the national agenda and that biological differences become more widely recognized as vital to health care treatment options. Both the size of staff and roster of volunteer leaders have grown over time to assist in these efforts. Medical nursing, and scientific experts from a wide range of disciplines have participated in SWHR's efforts.

SWHR staff relies on current and past members of SWHR Networks, expert resources, contributing authors of the Savvy Woman Patient, presenters from past SWHR conferences, as well as its scientific advisory board and Organization for the Study of Sex Differences (OSSD) members for the medical and technical knowledge that undergirds all its science programs, educational outreach, and advocacy efforts.

SWHR will continue to partner with the widest possible range of healthcare providers, policy makers, and scientists to gather evidence-based information and then communicate it as appropriate to Congress, the scientific research community, health care providers, health advocacy groups and the public.

Science
SWHR works with researchers and clinicians to advance the field of sexual biology. SWHR hosts scientific roundtables to encourage dialogue and research on biological differences.

SWHR established a series of networks working to foster interdisciplinary basic and clinical research on biological differences:

SWHR Interdisciplinary Network on Cardiovascular Disease.
SWHR Interdisciplinary Network on the Link Between Domestic Violence and Chronic Disease.
SWHR Interdisciplinary Network on Metabolism.
SWHR Interdisciplinary Network on Musculoskeletal Health.
SWHR Interdisciplinary Network on Sex, Gender, Drugs and the Brain.
SWHR Interdisciplinary Network on Sleep.
Susan G. Komen Network for the Study of Exercise and Breast Cancer.
SWHR Interdisciplinary Network on Urological Health in Women

In 2006, the "Society for Women's Health Research Medtronic Prize for Scientific Contributions to Women's Health," the annual $75,000 prize which recognizes a woman scientist or engineer for her contributions to women's health and encourages women to research issues uniquely related to women's health. SWHR created the Organization for the Study of Sex Differences (OSSD), a scientific membership society to enhance the knowledge of sex/gender differences by facilitating interdisciplinary communication and collaboration among scientists and clinicians of diverse backgrounds.

SWHR administers the RAISE Project, which focuses on increase the status of professional women through enhanced recognition of their achievements in science, technology, engineering, medicine and mathematics. In addition to Interdisciplinary Networks, SWHR supports roundtables, workshops, advisory meetings, and pilot research projects on:
Autoimmune diseases
Alzheimer's disease
Clinical trials
Domestic violence
Hormone therapy
Mental health
Mobile health
Oral care
Pain
Sexual health
Veteran's health

Advocacy
As the thought-leader in biological differences research, SWHR is often called upon to offer expert testimony before Congress and to provide guidance on legislative and regulatory matters on women's health.

Education
SWHR runs numerous campaigns, conferences, and media briefings to educate the public on women's health issues. SWHR also publishes a monthly e-newsletter and monthly news service article to keep the public informed about news relevant to women's health and biological differences.

SWHR's website features information on conditions that affect women predominantly or differently than men. They promote the inclusion of women and minorities in clinical trials by educating the public on how to participate and what to expect if they do join a trial.

In January 2006, SWHR published its first book for consumers, The Savvy Woman Patient: How and Why Sex Differences Impact Your Health. This consumer guide informs women about health conditions and treatments that are unique to women and focuses on how women's health differs from men's.

In 2014, SWHR released a national survey of 3,500 women to better understand women's habits and perceptions around breast cancer screening and mammograms, including the motivating factors, obstacles and barriers, emotional impact, and expectations for future testing.

The Raise Project 

The RAISE Project brings together awards from all different areas of STEM & medicine. It is the only project that lists over 1950 awards as well the winners and breaks down the distribution between men and women. Over 46,000 different recipients have been identified. Some individuals are cited over 30 different times. The RAISE Project data is gathered by systematically searching the websites for posted awards.

Data is collected began in 2005 and shows award listings of scientific societies and relevant professional organizations starting from 1981. The data is "scraped" from the site, entered into a content management system, parsed into awardees, award, year of award, awarding body, and the sex of the recipient. It is not always possible to determine whether someone is male or female by name alone, so it is fortunate for data collection that photographs are usually posted on the website. This has made identification of the sex much easier. Ethnic diversity is not identified.

Data collection began in 2006. Subsequently, information about awardees starting in 1981 was added. Data for the number of women and men in specific fields is obtained from publications of the National Science Foundation for STEM and the Association of American Medical Colleges.

Publications 
SWHR helped to launch the OSSD Journal of Sex Differences in 2010 and has contributed to the Journal of Women's Health.

References

External links
 

Women's political advocacy groups in the United States
Organizations established in 1990
Health care-related professional associations based in the United States
Medical and health organizations based in Wisconsin
Women's health